Angostura Municipality is a municipality in Sinaloa in northwestern Mexico. Its seat is the city of Angostura.

According to 2010 census, it had a population of 44,993 inhabitants.

Political subdivision 
Angostura Municipality is subdivided in 7 sindicaturas:
La Ilama
Colonia Agrícola México
Gato de Lara
Alhuey
Campo Plata 
La Reforma
La Colonia Agrícola Independencia

References

Municipalities of Sinaloa